The 2015–16 season was Carlisle United's 111th season in their history and their second consecutive season in League Two. Along with League Two, the club will also compete in the FA Cup, League Cup and League Trophy. The season covers the period from 1 July 2015 to 30 June 2016.

Squad statistics

 

|}

Top scorers

Disciplinary record

Notes:
 The red card that Jabo Ibehre received in the Round 28 match against Accrington Stanley was rescinded by the FA Appeal Board after the club appealed.

Transfers

Transfers in

Loans in

Transfers out

Total income:  £300,000

Loans out

Notes:
 Original loan was until 2 January. Loan terminated earlier due to Rigg sustaining an injury.

Competitions

Pre-season friendlies
On 11 June 2015, Carlisle United announced their finalised pre-season schedule.

League Two

League table

Results by matchday

Matches
On 17 June 2015, the fixtures for the forthcoming season were announced.

 

 

Notes:
 Carlisle's Round 22 home match was moved to Deepdale Stadium due to flooding from the Storm Desmond
 Carlisle's away match was postponed due to Accrington Stanley's home ground, Crown Ground was under water due to heavy rain.
 Carlisle's Round 24 home match was postponed to a later date due to the club unable to find an alternative venue because of the state of the home ground after flooding from the Storm Desmond.
 Carlisle's scheduled home match was moved to Ewood Park due to the home ground not in playable state after Storm Desmond and Storm Eva.
 Match was interrupted for 70 minutes in the tenth minute of the match after a fire alarm forced an evacuation of one of the grandstands at St. James Park.

FA Cup

The First Round draw took place on 26 October at 7pm at the club house of the FA Charter Standard Community Club Thackley Juniors F.C. based in Thackley in West Yorkshire,  and was broadcast live on BBC Two and BBC Radio 5 Live.

Notes:
  Match was moved to Bloomfield Road due to the state of the home ground after flooding from the Storm Desmond

League Cup
On 16 June 2015, the first round draw was made, Carlisle United were drawn at home against Chesterfield. The second round saw Carlisle draw Queens Park Rangers away.

Football League Trophy
On 8 August 2015, live on Soccer AM the draw for the first round of the Football League Trophy was drawn by Toni Duggan and Alex Scott. Carlisle travelled to Port Vale and were defeated in the first round.

References

Carlisle United F.C. seasons
Carlisle United